Don Connellan is a Gaelic football manager and former player. He played his football for the Kilmore club and at senior level for the Roscommon county team, while working as a guard.

Connellan is from Kilmore. He made his senior inter-county championship debut in 1993 in a 1–12 to 1–10 win over Leitrim in Carrick-on-Shannon. Connellan won a Connacht Senior Football Championship title while playing for Roscommon in 2001.

As a manager, he led Moycullen to a maiden Galway Senior Football Championship title in 2020. He was part of Maurice Sheridan's management team when NUI Galway got a Sigerson Cup in 2021.

References

Year of birth missing (living people)
Living people
Gaelic football managers
Garda Síochána officers
Roscommon inter-county Gaelic footballers